The 1973 NCAA Division II Men's Soccer Championship was the second annual tournament held by the NCAA to determine the top men's Division II college soccer program in the United States. It was also the first to be branded as the "Division II" tournament, following the NCAA splitting its former College Division to create Divisions II and III. However, this tournament continued to feature D-III schools, as the NCAA did not establish a separate D-III championship until 1974.

Missouri–Saint Louis defeated Cal State Fullerton in the final match, 3–0, to win their first national title. The final was played in Springfield, Massachusetts at Springfield College on December 8, 1973.

Bracket

Final

See also  
 1973 NCAA Division I Soccer Tournament
 1973 NAIA Soccer Championship

References 

NCAA Division II Men's Soccer Championship
NCAA Division II Men's Soccer Championship
NCAA Division II Men's Soccer Championship
NCAA Division II Men's Soccer Championship